Jesús Romero  may refer to:
Jesús Adrián Romero, Mexican author, Christian music singer, composer, and pastor
Jesús Casillas Romero, Mexican Institutional Revolutionary Party politician
Jesús Escandell Romero, president of the Cuban trade union Central de Trabajadores Cubanos
Jesús Romero Martín (born 1984), Spanish wheelchair basketball player
Jesús Zúñiga Romero, Mexican New Alliance Party politician